Mount Spatz is a mountain, 2,270 m, standing 10 nautical miles (18 km) west-southwest of Mount Weihaupt in the Outback Nunataks. Mapped by United States Geological Survey (USGS) from surveys and U.S. Navy air photos, 1959–64. Named by Advisory Committee on Antarctic Names (US-ACAN) for Richard Spatz, station engineer at McMurdo Station, 1968.

Mountains of Victoria Land
Pennell Coast